Chasing Trouble is a 1940 American comedy-drama film directed by Howard Bretherton, from Monogram Pictures.

Plot summary 

Jimmy "Mr. Cupid" O’Brien (Frankie Darro) and Thomas H. Jefferson (Mantan Moreland) are making deliveries for the local florist and manage to get a job for their unemployed friend, Susie Carey (Marjorie Reynolds).

They are unaware that the proprietor, Mr. Morgan (Alex Callam), is part of a spy and saboteur ring which is using the florist shop as a front for delivering coded messages and bombs.

Using lesson two of his correspondence course on graphology, Jimmy learns the truth but it might be too late for intrepid investigative reporter Callahan (Milburn Stone) and the police to help them before the bomb they are supposed to deliver goes off at an airplane factory.

Cast
Frankie Darro as Jimmy 'Cupid' O'Brien
Mantan Moreland as Jefferson
Marjorie Reynolds as Susie
Milburn Stone as Callahan
Cheryl Walker as Phyllis Bentley
George Cleveland as Lester
Alex Callam as Morgan
Tristram Coffin as Phillips
I. Stanford Jolley as Molotoff
Lillian Elliott as Mrs. O'Brien
Willy Castello as Kurt
Donald Kerr as Cassidy

External links 

1940 films
1940s mystery comedy-drama films
American black-and-white films
Monogram Pictures films
American mystery comedy-drama films
Films directed by Howard Bretherton
1940s English-language films
1940s American films